Eystein Husebye (born 1937) is a Norwegian seismologist.

He was born in Sulitjelma, Salten. He took doctoral degrees at Uppsala University and the University of Oslo. He worked as researcher at NORSAR from 1968 to 1993 and adjunct professor at the University of Oslo from 1979 to 1990. He was then a professor of seismology at the University of Bergen from 1979 to his retirement. He is a member of the Norwegian Academy of Science and Letters.

References

1937 births
Living people
People from Fauske
Norwegian seismologists
Academic staff of the University of Oslo
Academic staff of the University of Bergen
Members of the Norwegian Academy of Science and Letters